Sołotwa (also: Słotwa) is a river of Poland, a tributary of the Lubaczówka in Lubaczów.

Rivers of Poland
Rivers of Podkarpackie Voivodeship